Thiruvattar is a panchayat town in Kanyakumari district in the Indian state of Tamil Nadu.

About the town
The two main rivers Pahrali River and Kothai surround the village and join in Moovattumugam, giving the name Thiru (sacred)+ vatta (surround)+ aru (river). This village, where the famous Sri Adikesavaperumal Temple is located, is one of the 108 Divya Desams.

Demographics
 India census, Thiruvattaru had a population of 18,404. Males constitute 49% of the population and females 51%. Thiruvattaru has an average literacy rate of 77%, higher than the national average of 59.5%: male literacy is 78%, and female literacy is 75%. In Thiruvattaru, 10% of the population is under 6 years of age.

Politics
Thiruvattar assembly constituency is part of Nagercoil (Lok Sabha constituency).

As per the latest restructuring, the Thiruvattar assembly constituency has been split and merged with nearby constituencies.

See also
 Kulasekaram
 Vaikunda Chella Pathi
 Kesavapuram
 Excel Central School

References

 
Cities and towns in Kanyakumari district